The following is a timeline of the history of the city of San Diego, California, United States.

Before the 19th century

 ca. 8000 BCE - 1000 CE – Paleo-Indian groups, such as the La Jolla complex and the San Dieguito complex, arrived in the region and inhabited the area.

 ca. 1000 CE – Kumeyaay migrate to the San Diego area from the east. Villages such as Kosa'aay are established in the area.
 1542 – First European contact with the area, as Juan Rodríguez Cabrillo enters San Diego Bay.
 1602 – Second European contact, as Sebastián Vizcaíno maps and names San Diego Bay.

Spanish colonization (1769-1821) 
 1769 – Presidio of San Diego and Mission San Diego de Alcalá established at the Kumeyaay village of Kosa'aay; first European settlements of Alta California in New Spain.
 1774 – Mission is moved from Presidio Hill to current site 6 miles away, near San Diego River
 1775 – Kumeyaay Revolt of 1775, Mission San Diego is sacked.
1778 – Pa’mu Incident, Kumeyaay revolt resulting in the first public execution sentence by colonial authorities in California (although the execution did not follow through as planned).
 1795 – Public school opens.

19th century
 1800 – 6.5 magnitude Earthquake
 1804 – Province of Las Californias divided, the San Diego region becomes part of Alta California.
1812 – Earthquake destroys Mission San Diego de Alcalá, rebuilt the following year
1817 – Mission Dam and aqueduct constructed.

Mexican period (1821–1848) 
1821 – Mexico gains its independence from Spain; San Diego becomes part of the Mexican province of Alta California.
1825 – San Diego becomes the unofficial capital of Alta California, under the influence of Governor Jose Maria Echeandia.
1826 – Presidio skirmish kills 28 Kumeyaay natives.
1833 – Mexican secularization act of 1833 closes the Mission San Diego de Alcalá.
 1834
 Mission secularized; Mission lands sold or given to wealthy Californios. Missionized Kumeyaay pressured to abandon coastal regions and move inland.
 San Diego becomes a pueblo.
 Richard Henry Dana, Jr. visits San Diego as a sailor, later writing about his experiences in the best-selling book Two Years Before the Mast.
 1835 – Juan María Osuna is elected the first alcalde (mayor) of San Diego.
 1836 – Alta California disestablished and merged with Las Californias under the Siete Leyes.
1837 – First Kumeyaay raid on San Diego.
 1838 – San Diego loses pueblo status because of declining population amid increasing hostilities between the Californio settlers and the Kumeyaay, becomes sub-prefecture of Pueblo de Los Ángeles.
 1840 – Population: 140.
1842 – Second Kumeyaay raid on San Diego.
1844 – Kumeyaay-Quechan blockade reaches the Pacific from the Colorado River, halting southbound overland traffic from San Diego until 1846.
 1846–47 Mexican–American War
 Battle of San Pasqual on December 6–7, 1846
 Treaty of Cahuenga ceasefire signed January 13, 1847
1847 – Siete Leyes repealed, reestablishing Alta California and Baja California territories. Baja California territory is granted more land north, placing the provincial border just south of Tijuana.

Late 19th Century (1850s–1890s) 
 1848 – Treaty of Guadalupe Hidalgo (proclaimed July 4, 1848) transfers San Diego and mostly all of Alta California to the United States of America as part of the Mexican Cession territory, international border drawn closer to San Diego at a parallel "one Spanish league" south of the southernmost point of San Diego Bay.
 1850
 California is admitted to the United States; San Diego becomes seat of San Diego County; San Diego is granted a city charter by the California legislature.
 William Heath Davis proposes "New San Diego" by the bay front, builds a pier and lays out streets, but proposed development is unsuccessful
 1851 
Herald newspaper begins publication.
San Diego Tax Rebellion of 1851 begins, led by Cupeño and Kumeyaay natives after San Diego County charges local natives to pay up an annual $600 in property taxes. Western theatre of the Yuma War opens up in San Diego County.
The Movement for State Division of California convenes in San Diego to discuss the secession of Southern California from the rest of California, as the proposed state of Colorado.
 1852
 Antonio Garra is tried and executed in San Diego. San Diego Tax Rebellion and the Yuma War in San Diego County ends. 
City goes bankrupt; city charter repealed by legislature; city placed under control of a board of trustees
 U.S. Army sets aside southern part of Point Loma for military uses, later developed into Fort Rosecrans
 1855 – Point Loma Lighthouse built.
 1858 – October: Hurricane.
1859 – San Diego County votes to secede from California to form the Territory of Colorado, voting 207–24 in favor of secession
1862 – 6.0 magnitude Earthquake
 1866 – Louis Rose lays out town of Roseville, later incorporated into San Diego
 1867
 Alonzo Horton promotes move to "New Town", site of current Downtown.
 Population: 12.
 1868
City reserves  of land as City Park, now Balboa Park
San Diego Union newspaper begins publication.
 1870
 Chamber of Commerce established.
 Horton House hotel in business.
 1871 – City and County records are moved from Old Town to New Town, establishing New Town as the city's hub
 1872 – San Diego incorporated.
1875 – Ulysses S. Grant sets aside reservation land for several Kumeyaay bands. Second round of reservations established in 1893.
 1880 – Population: 2,637; county 8,018.
 1881 – The Sun newspaper begins publication.
 1882 –
 San Diego Free Public Library established.
 Russ High School (now San Diego High School) opens; first high school in the city.
 YMCA established.
 1883-1886 - John J. Montgomery makes successful flights with manned gliders at Otay Mesa, the first controlled flights in a heavier-than-air flying machine in America.
 1885 – Santa Fe railway begins operating.
 1886 – Horse-drawn streetcar line established downtown.
 1887
 Ocean Beach founded.
 San Diego Daily Bee newspaper begins publication.
 National City & Otay Rail Road begins operating.
 Electric streetcar line established between Downtown and Old Town.
 1888 – Sweetwater Dam completed.
 1889
 City rechartered; mayor-council form of government adopted.
 Beth Israel synagogue built.
 1890 - Population: 16,159.
 1892 – San Diego Electric Railway begins operating.
 1895 – Evening Tribune newspaper begins publication.
 1897 – San Diego State Normal School (now San Diego State University) established.
 1898 – Lomaland established by the Theosophical Society in Point Loma.
 1900 - Population: 17,700.

20th century

1900s–1940s

 1901 – Raja Yoga Academy established at Lomaland.
 1903 – Marine Biological Association of San Diego founded; now Scripps Institution of Oceanography.
 1904 – Navy Coaling Station established on Point Loma; first navy establishment in the city.
 1905 – USS Bennington (PG-4) explodes in the harbor due to a faulty boiler, killing 66 and injuring 46; burial and memorial at what later becomes Fort Rosecrans National Cemetery
 1906 – Navy wireless radio station established on Point Loma.
 1908 – Great White Fleet visits San Diego.
 1909
 Scripps Building constructed.
 Construction begins on Broadway Fountain in Horton Plaza.
 William Smythe founds San Ysidro, later (1957) annexed to San Diego.
 1910
"City Park" renamed Balboa Park.
 U.S. Grant Hotel built.
 San Diego Civic Orchestra active.
 Aero Club established.
 Population: 39,578; county 61,665.
 Broadway Fountain completed and dedicated October 15, 1910.
 1912 – February: San Diego free speech fight begins.
 1913 – Cabrillo National Monument established.
 1915
 Santa Fe Depot opens.
 March 9: Panama–California Exposition opens.
 May: San Diego stadium opens; now Balboa Stadium.
 1916 – January–February: the "Hatfield flood", a major flood blamed by San Diegans on Charles Hatfield, a rainmaker they had hired.
1916- San Diego Zoo Established
 1917
Army Camp Kearny established at the site of what would later become Marine Corps Air Station Miramar.
Marine Corps Camp Matthews marksmanship range established at the site of what would later become the University of California, San Diego
 1919
 San Diego and Arizona Railway completed.
 National Association for the Advancement of Colored People branch established.
 Holy Cross Cemetery dedicated.
 1920 – Population: 74,683; county 112,248.
 1921
 U.S. Marine Corps training base commissioned.
 1922
 U.S. Navy Destroyer Base, San Diego established; now Naval Base San Diego.
 Rancho Santa Fe settled near San Diego.
 1923 
Naval Training Center San Diego established.
San Diego annexes East San Diego.
 1924 – The first United States aircraft carrier  began operating out of North Island.
 1925
 Mission Beach Amusement Center (amusement park) opens.
 U.S. Naval hospital built.
 1926
Star of India is towed into San Diego harbor; later renovated and opened as a museum ship
Fine Arts Gallery opens; now the San Diego Museum of Art.
 1927
 Charles Lindbergh's plane The Spirit of St. Louis is designed and built in San Diego by the Ryan Airline Company.
 Prudden-San Diego Airplane Company in business; later Solar Aircraft Company, now Solar Turbines.
 El Cortez Hotel built.
 1928
 San Diego Municipal Airport dedicated as Lindbergh Field.
 San Diego Historical Society founded; now the San Diego History Center.
 1929 – Fox Theatre dedicated.
 1930 – Population: 147,995; county 209,659.
 1931 
San Diego State College dedicated; formerly San Diego State Normal School, now San Diego State University.
New city charter adopted under a council–manager form of government
 1933 – Aztec Brewing Company relocates to city.
 1934 – Ryan Aeronautical Company in business.
 1935
 May 29: California Pacific International Exposition opens.
 Old Globe Theatre established.
 Consolidated Aircraft Company relocates to city.
 1936
San Diego Padres established as a minor league team within the Pacific Coast League.
Roman Catholic Diocese of San Diego established.
 1937 – U.S. Coast Guard Air Station San Diego commissioned.
 1938 – San Diego Civic Center dedicated; now the San Diego County Administration Center.
 1940
Marine base Camp Elliott established adjacent to Camp Kearny.
Population: 203,341; county 289,348.
 1941 – Consolidated Aircraft becomes San Diego's largest employer with 25,000 employees.
 1942
Residents of Japanese decent are evicted from San Diego and relocated to internment camps.
U.S. Marine Corps Base Camp Pendleton established near city.
Japanese submarine I-17 lands secretly at Point Loma before heading north to attack Santa Barbara.
 1943
Consolidated Aircraft and Vultee Aircraft merge to become Convair.
Camp Kearny recommissioned as Naval Auxiliary Air Station Camp Kearny and Marine Corps Air Depot Miramar.
 1945 – Navy Electronics Laboratory established, now part of Space and Naval Warfare Systems Center Pacific.
 1946 – Submarine Group San Diego established, now part of Naval Base Point Loma.
1948 –  Maritime Museum of San Diego established.

1950s–1990s

 1950 – Population: 333,865; county 556,808.
 1952
 San Diego College for Women opens; now the University of San Diego.
 Miramar Naval Air Station established.
 1953 – Urban League established.
 1955
 General Atomics in business.
 Journal of San Diego History begins publication.
 1957
 Fort Rosecrans transferred to U.S. Navy.
 Sister city relationship established with Yokohama, Japan.
San Diego annexes San Ysidro.
 1960
 University of California, San Diego and Salk Institute for Biological Studies established.
 Population: 573,224; county 1,033,011.
 1961
 San Diego Chargers move to San Diego after one season in Los Angeles.
1962 – San Diego annexes Rancho Bernardo.
 1963
 Navy Submarine Support Facility established, now part of Naval Base Point Loma.
 San Diego Aerospace Museum established.
 Executive Complex built.
 1964
San Diego Community Concourse and City Hall open.
SeaWorld San Diego opens.
San Diego annexes the rest of northern San Diego, making up most of today's municipal borders.
 1965 – Timken Museum of Art established.
 1966
San Diego International Sports Center opens, later known as San Diego Sports Arena, iPay One Center, and Valley View Casino Center, now Pechanga Arena.
San Diego County Comprehensive Planning Organization established, now San Diego Association of Governments (SANDAG).
 1967
San Diego Stadium opens, later known as Jack Murphy Stadium, Qualcomm Stadium, and SDCCU Stadium.
 Historical Resources Board established.
San Diego Rockets established in the NBA.
 1969
 San Diego Padres established as a Major League Baseball team.
 San Diego–Coronado Bridge and Union Bank of California Building constructed.
 TOPGUN United States Navy Strike Fighter Tactics Instructor program was established at Miramar Naval Sir Station.
 Sister city relationships established with Cavite City, Philippines; and León, Mexico.
 1970
 Golden State Comic Book Convention begins, now San Diego Comic-Con International.
 Chicano Park established in Barrio Logan.
1971 – San Diego Rockets relocate to Houston to become the Houston Rockets.
 1972 
San Diego Wild Animal Park opens.
The 1972 Republican National Convention, scheduled to take place in San Diego, was moved to Miami on three months' notice; Mayor Pete Wilson proclaimed "America's Finest City Week" during what would have been convention week.
 1975 – Centre City Development Corporation formed.
 1976 - Sister city relationship established with Tema, Ghana.
 1977 - Sister city relationship established with Edinburgh, UK.
 1978
NBA Buffalo Braves relocate to San Diego to become the San Diego Clippers.
September 25 – PSA Flight 182 crashes on approach to San Diego Airport, killing all 137 people on board and 7 people on the ground; at the time the deadliest plane crash in the U.S.
 1980 – Population: 875,538; county 1,861,846.
 1981 – San Diego Trolley begins operating.
 1982 - Sister city relationships established with Alcalá de Henares, Spain; and Jeonju, South Korea.
 1983 - Sister city relationship established with Taichung City, Taiwan.
1984 – San Diego Clippers relocate to Los Angeles becoming the Los Angeles Clippers.
 1985
 Westfield Horton Plaza in business.
 Sister city relationship established with Yantai, China.
 1986 
Maureen O'Connor becomes the first woman elected as the mayor of San Diego.
Sister city relationship established with Perth, Australia.
1987 - Asian Pacific Thematic Historic District is designated by the city.
 1989
 San Diego Convention Center opens.
 Symphony Towers built.
 1990 - Population: 1,110,549.
 1991
 One America Plaza built.
 Sister city relationship established with Vladivostok, USSR.
 1992 – inSITE art exhibition begins.
 1993 - Sister city relationship established with Tijuana, Mexico.
 1994 - City website online.
 1995
 May 17 – Shawn Nelson steals an M60A3 Patton tank and goes on a rampage with it before being shot and killed by police.
 Sister city relationship established with Campinas, Brazil.
 1996
 August: 1996 Republican National Convention held.
Little Italy, San Diego is designated.
 Sister city relationship established with Warsaw, Poland.
 1997
U.S. Navy Space and Naval Warfare Systems Command ("SPAWAR") headquarters relocated to San Diego.
Naval Training Center San Diego closes, becomes Liberty Station over the next couple of decades.
 1999 – Legoland California opens in nearby Carlsbad.
2000 – Population: 1,223,400.

21st century

 2001 – San Diego River Park Foundation established.
2003 – Cedar Fire burns through hundreds of homes in Scripps Ranch.
 2004
 Petco Park (ballpark) opens.
USS Midway Museum opens on Embarcadero.
 Sister city relationship established with Jalalabad, Afghanistan.
 2005
 Voice of San Diego begins publication.
San Diego Trolley Green Line opens in Mission Valley.
2006 – San Diego reverts to a Mayor-council form of government on a five-year trial basis. Form of government made permanent in 2010.
 2007
Roman Catholic Diocese of San Diego sex abuse trial held.
October 2007 San Diego County wildfires hundreds of thousands to evacuate, exceeding the number evacuated from New Orleans during Hurricane Katrina.
 2008 
Electra highrise built.
2008 San Diego F/A-18 crashes into University City neighborhood, killing 4.
 2009 – Watchdog Institute established at San Diego State University.
 2010 – Population: 1,307,402; metro 3,095,313.
 2011
 March 18 – Harbor Drive Pedestrian Bridge opens.
 September 8 – 2011 Southwest blackout occurs. 1.4 million customers in San Diego County are left without power.
October 7 - December 22 – Occupy San Diego protest movement demonstrates in San Diego stemming from the Occupy Wall Street movement in New York City. 139 were arrested.
 2013 – Little Saigon, San Diego is designated.
 2015
Sister city relationship established with Panama City, Panama.
Carlsbad desalination plant opens December 14, north of San Diego.
2016 – San Diego Chargers relocate to Los Angeles, becoming the Los Angeles Chargers.
2017 
Hepatitis A outbreak occurs in San Diego, particularly in downtown.
Balboa Park and Barrio Logan receive state-level designations as cultural districts from the state of California.
San Diego Seals formed, joins the National Lacrosse League.
2020 
Todd Gloria becomes the first person of color and member of the LGBTQ community to be elected as mayor of San Diego.
Horton Plaza Mall demolished.
 The COVID-19 Pandemic have reached the city of San Diego, which impacted the city's economy, culture, society, and the business of any district or neighborhood.
Convoy (Pan Asian Cultural & Business Innovation) District is designated.
2021 
SDCCU Stadium demolished.
The Rady Shell at Jacobs Park opens in Embarcadero Marina.
2022 – Sesame Place San Diego opens in Chula Vista, California.

Anticipated future events 
2023 – San Diego set to host 2023 World Lacrosse Championship.
2024 – San Diego and Tijuana set to host World Design Capital 2024.

See also
 History of San Diego
 List of pre-statehood mayors of San Diego
 List of mayors of San Diego (since 1850)
 List of San Diego Historic Landmarks
 Timeline of Tijuana history
 Timeline of California
 Timelines of other cities in the Southern California area of California: Anaheim, Bakersfield, Long Beach, Los Angeles, Riverside, San Bernardino, Santa Ana

References

Bibliography

Published in the 19th century
 
 
 
 
 
 1899

Published in the 20th century
 
 1909, 1916, 1923, 1925

Published in the 21st century

External links

 
 
 
 Digital Public Library of America. Items related to San Diego, various dates
San Diego History Center

History of San Diego
San Diego-related lists
san diego